Joseph Goodman may refer to:

 Joseph Goodman (game designer), role-playing game designer
 Joseph W. Goodman, engineer and physicist
 Joseph T. Goodman, journalist and archaeologist